Adi Sulistya (born on November 4, 1991) is an Indonesian footballer who currently plays for Persih Tembilahan in the Liga Indonesia Premier Division.

References

1991 births
Association football forwards
Living people
Indonesian footballers
Liga 1 (Indonesia) players
Pelita Bandung Raya players